Goodnight, Thank You, You've Been a Lovely Audience is a DVD featuring Sinéad O'Connor. It was released on August 26, 2003 and contains footage from her goodbye  concert in her hometown Dublin in 2002. In addition to the concert performance, the DVD contains extra material consisting of a documentary about the making of the album Sean-Nós Nua and various interviews and behind the scenes footage as well as 6 bonus videos.

Track listing

Bonus videos:
 Peggy Gordon
 Molly Malone
 The Moorlough Shore
 The Singing Bird
 My Lagan Love
 Óró, Sé Do Bheatha 'Bhaile

Extra material

 Making of Sean-Nós Nua
 Backstage footage
 Interviews

References

Further reading
 Sinéad O'Connor to retire from music, rte.ie, April 25, 2003
 Sinead O'Connor, Goodnight, Thank You You've Been a Lovely Audience, The Guardian, October 10, 2003
 Sinead O'Connor Goodnight, Thank You, You've Been A Lovely Audience, Music Week, August 9, 2003

Video albums by Irish artists
2003 video albums
Sinéad O'Connor albums
Live video albums
2000s English-language films